Sheila (stylized as SHEILA; born January 16, 1973, in Cuba) is a Japanese model, entertainer, sportscaster and actress who is represented by Horipro. Her mother is Cuban and her father is Japanese.

Filmography

TV series

Regular appearances

Quasi-regular appearances

Occasional appearances

Past appearances

Dramas

Radio series

References

External links
 

Cuban people of Japanese descent
Cuban emigrants to Japan
Japanese female models
Japanese television personalities
Japanese radio personalities
Japanese people of Cuban descent
1973 births
Living people